For information on the Rebus word and picture puzzle see Rebus.

Rebus is a British television detective drama series based on the Inspector Rebus novels by the Scottish author Ian Rankin. The series was produced by STV Studios for the ITV network, and four series were broadcast between 26 April 2000 and 7 December 2007. The first series starred John Hannah as DI John Rebus; and was co-produced by Hannah's own production company, Clerkenwell Films. After Hannah quit the series, the role of Rebus was re-cast, with Ken Stott appearing as Rebus in three subsequent series, which were produced in-house by STV.

The first series is very different in both format and style. Hannah's portrayal of Rankin's world-weary detective was questioned by many who knew the books, as he did not physically match their image of John Rebus; Hannah himself has said he felt forced into the role, having been executive producer, when his own choice for the role, Peter Mullan, was rejected by STV. However, his interpretation of the inspector has been viewed as deeper than the later productions, using narration to expand the viewers insight into the character's thoughts, or to reveal background information, which never occurs during Stott's tenure. The earlier stories also retained the darkness of the novels and were more faithful to the original storylines, while longer running times meant that each story could be less ruthless with Rankin's many asides and sub-plots.

In February 2008, ITV announced that Rebus had been axed, amid reports that Stott had told producers he did not want to continue in the role. ITV indicated that "one-off specials are a possibility for the future." In April 2011, it was reported that the series could make a return to television, and a spokeswoman for STV confirmed a comeback was on the cards: "We fully intend to bring Rebus back in the future. There are no firm plans yet, but it will return." However, Rankin has since announced that he has purchased the rights to the TV series back, and that he does not intend to bring Rebus back in the present format, having criticised the shorter format of the final series.

Release 
All three Stott series were released on DVD in the United Kingdom in 2007. In Region 1, Koch Vision released the first series on DVD on 10 January 2006. Series two through four were later released by Acorn Media between 2006 and 2008. In 2008, Delta released the Hannah series in a four-disc box set.

Cast
 John Hannah as DI John Rebus (Series 1)
 Ken Stott as DI John Rebus (Series 2–4)
 Gayanne Potter as DS Siobhan Clarke (Series 1)
 Claire Price as DS Siobhan Clarke (Series 2–4)
 Sara Stewart as DCI Gill Templer (Series 1)
 Jennifer Black as DCI Gill Templer (Series 2–4)
 Ron Donachie as DCS Jack Gunner (Series 3–4) 
 Ewan Stewart as DI Jack Morton (Series 1–4)
 Jenny Ryan as WPC Mary Logan (Series 1)
 Jason Houghton Traffic Warden (series 1)

Episode list

Series 1 (2000–2004)
The fourth and final episode was originally due for broadcast on 20 September 2001 but was indefinitely postponed following the terrorist attacks on the World Trade Center on 11 September 2001 and didn't air until four years later during a re-run of the series on ITV3 and the subsequent repeats on Alibi, Drama, and STV2 (formerly STV Glasgow and STV Edinburgh) having never been broadcast on ITV.

Series 2 (2006)

Series 3 (2006)

Series 4 (2007)
"The First Stone" is the first and only story to be featured throughout the series which is not based upon a full Rebus novel, rather a novella from a collection of short stories. "Knots and Crosses" was due to be broadcast on 19 October 2007, but was postponed for reasons unknown. It was eventually broadcast on 7 December 2007. It bears the name of a Rankin book, but does not share the plot.

References

External links
 

Ian Rankin (Official website)

 
2000s British crime drama television series
2000s British mystery television series
2000s Scottish television series
2000 Scottish television series debuts
2007 Scottish television series endings
British detective television series
English-language television shows
Films shot in Edinburgh
ITV television dramas
Scottish television shows
Television series by Clerkenwell Films
Television series by STV Studios
Television shows based on British novels
Television shows produced by Scottish Television
Television shows set in Edinburgh
Television shows set in Scotland